Stanley Frank "Stan" Vickers (18 June 1932 – 17 April 2013) was a Lewisham-born British athlete who mainly competed in the 20 kilometre walk.

He competed for Great Britain in the 20 kilometre walk at the 1960 Summer Olympics held in Rome, Italy, where he won the bronze medal.

After the race, he sat down to rest and was carried off by an ambulance crew that thought he was sick. The crew did not speak English. Several hours passed before officials discovered what had happened.

He died on 19 April 2013 at the age of 80.

References

1932 births
2013 deaths
British male racewalkers
English male racewalkers
Olympic bronze medallists for Great Britain
Athletes (track and field) at the 1956 Summer Olympics
Athletes (track and field) at the 1960 Summer Olympics
Olympic athletes of Great Britain
European Athletics Championships medalists
People from Lewisham
Athletes from London
Medalists at the 1960 Summer Olympics
Olympic bronze medalists in athletics (track and field)
English Olympic medallists